The following lists events that happened during 1879 in South Africa.

Incumbents
 Governor of the Cape of Good Hope and High Commissioner for Southern Africa: Henry Barkly.
 Lieutenant-governor of the Colony of Natal: Henry Ernest Gascoyne Bulwer.
 State President of the Orange Free State: Jan Brand.
 State President of the South African Republic: vacant.
 Lieutenant-Governor of Griqualand West: William Owen Lanyon (until March), James Rose Innes (starting March).
 Prime Minister of the Cape of Good Hope: John Charles Molteno (until February), John Gordon Sprigg (starting February).

Events

January
 11 – Britain declares war against the Zulus and launches the Anglo-Zulu War after an ultimatum issued on 11 December 1878 is rejected.
 22 – The Zulus wipe out British forces in the Battle of Isandlwana.
 22-23 – The British prevail against a Zulu attack in the Battle of Rorke's Drift.

March
 7 – The first British troops arrive in Durban from all over the Empire.
 12 – A force of 2,000 Zulus attacks a British camp at Ntombi River. Of the 60 men in the camp, only 15 escape.

July
 4 – The Zulus are defeated at Ulundi and the war ends.

August
 28 – The Zulu King Cetshwayo is captured.

Births

Deaths
 4 May – William Froude, engineer, hydrodynamicist and naval architect, dies in Simon's Town
 1 June – Napoléon Eugène, Prince Imperial is killed in action when ambushed by Zulus during the Anglo-Zulu War.

Railways

Railway lines opened

 March – Natal – Pinetown to Botha's Hill, .
 11 August – Cape Western – Grootfontein to Fraserburg Road, .
 26 August – Cape Midland – Mount Stewart to Graaff-Reinet, .
 1 September – Natal – Avoca to Verulam, .
 3 September – Cape Midland – Alicedale to Grahamstown, .
 17 September – Cape Midland – Alicedale to Middleton, .
 3 November – Cape Eastern – Döhne to Cathcart, .

Locomotives
Cape
 Two new  locomotive types enter service on the Cape Government Railways (CGR):
 The first four of fifteen 1st Class 4-4-0 American type passenger locomotives on the Western and Eastern systems.
 The first six of ten 1st Class 2-6-0 Mogul type goods locomotives on the Western system.
 The Table Bay Harbour Board places its fourth  Brunel gauge 0-4-0 well-tank engine in excavation and breakwater construction service.

Natal
 The Natal Government Railways places seven  locomotives in service, later to be modified to a  wheel arrangement and designated Class G.
 The Natal Harbours Department in Durban places a single  saddle-tank locomotive in service, named John Milne.

References

 
South Africa
Years in South Africa